Carol F. Karlsen (born 15 December 1940) is an American historian.

Career 
She received her B.A. degree from the University of Maryland in 1970, her
M.A. degree from New York University in 1972, and her Ph.D. degree from Yale University in
1980.

Her books have received mostly positive reviews.

She was awarded a Guggenheim Fellowship in 1989.

Bibliography 
Some of her books are:

 The Devil in the Shape of a Woman: Witchcraft in Colonial New England 
 The Salem Witchcraft Trials: A History in Documents 
 The Journal of Esther Edwards Burr, 1754-1757

References

External links
 

21st-century American historians
1940 births
Living people
University System of Maryland alumni
New York University alumni
Yale University alumni